George  Portwood (died c.1744) was a carpenter and architect who worked in Stamford.<ref> Colvin says he died 3 May 1742
Colvin’’, 599</ref>He was Chamberlain of Stamford in 1736 and Mayor of Stamford. 

Work by George Portwood

Bridge over the River Nene at Fotheringhay 1722.
Took down the ruinous steeple of Pickworth Church, Rutland
George Hotel, Stamford refronted in 1724 by George Portwood, and further alterations and repairs were carried out between then and 1726.
Bridge at Woodnewton, Northamptonshire, 1735  (now demolished).
Rebuilt Braunston Church Tower, Rutland.
Witham on the Hill Church, Lincoln (1737). The tower and steeple were rebuilt in a medieval revival style by Portwood in 1737–38."Antram",(1989) p. 807
Barn Hill, Stamford. Portwood provided William Stukeley with designs for a frontage for Barn Hill House.

Buildings likely to be by Portwood.
These are buildings attributed to Portwood by John Harris on their similarity to Portwood’s designs for Barn Hill. 
21 High Street, Stamford
13 Barnhill, Stamford 
Leasingham Manor, Lincolnshire. 

Literature
Antram N. (revised), Pevsner N. & Harris J., (1989), The Buildings of England: Lincolnshire, Yale University Press. 
Colvin H. A. (1995), Biographical Dictionary of British Architects 1600–1840. Yale University Press, 3rd edition London, p. 599.
Harris J. (1965), The Architecture of Stamford,  in Rogers A. (ed) The Making of Stamford, Leicester University Press
Royal Commission on the Historical Monuments of England. 1977. An Inventory of Historical Monuments. The Town of Stamford  No 239, pp. 104–06, plates 94, 119, 128, 133
Smith J. F. ( 2013) William Stukeley in Stamford: His Houses, Gardens and a Project for a Palladian Triumphal Arch Over Barn Hill'', Antiquaries Journal,  Volume 93  September 2013, pp. 353–400

References

1742 deaths
18th-century English architects
Architects from Lincolnshire
Year of birth uncertain
People from Stamford, Lincolnshire